This is a list of Sami women who are Sami or who are of established Sami descent.

A
Nina Afanasyeva (born 1939), Russian-Sami politician and language activist
Inger-Mari Aikio-Arianaick (born 1961), Finnish Sami poet and journalist
Agneta Andersson (born 1958), Swedish Sami sculptor and educator
Karen Anette Anti (born 1972), Norwegian Sami politician
Aleksandra Andreevna Antonova (1932–2014), Russian, Kildin Sami teacher, writer, poet, translator
Linda Aslaksen (born 1986), Norwegian Sami street artist and educator

B
Astrid Båhl (born 1959), Norwegian Sami artist, designed the Sami flag
Katarina Barruk (born 1994), Swedish Sami singer who performs in the Ume Sami language
Matte Heatta Bjelland (born 1983), better known as Máddji, Norwegian-Sami singer, composer and soccer player
Ellen-Sylvia Blind (1925–2009), Swedish Sami writer 
Mari Boine (born 1956), musician,  Norwegian Sami
Ella Holm Bull (1929–2006), Southern Sami teacher and writer

C
Milla Clementsdotter (1812–1892), Swedish Southern Sami  Christian advocate

D
Sandra Dahlberg (born 1979), Swedish Sami singer
Maja Dunfjeld (born 1947), Norwegian South Sami duodji expert

E
Monica Edmondson (born 1963), Swedish Sami glass artist
Hanne Grete Einarsen (born 1966), Norwegian Sami artist
Berit Marie Eira (born 1968), Norwegian Sami reindeer herder and politician
Berit Oskal Eira (born 1951), Norwegian Sami politician
Rawdna Carita Eira (born 1970), Norwegian Sami playwright
Sandra Andersen Eira (born 1986), Norwegian Sami politician
Edel Hætta Eriksen (born 1921), Norwegian Sami schoolteacher and politician
Elisabeth Erke (born 1962), Norwegian Sami educator and politician

G
Johanne Gaup (born 1950), Norwegian Sami politician

H
Barbro-Lill Hætta-Jacobsen (born 1972), Norwegian Sami politician
Ellen Inga O. Hætta (born 1953), Norwegian Sami politician and educator
Marja Helander (born 1965), Finnish Sami photographer and filmmaker
Mette Henriette (born 1990), Norwegian Sami artist, Saxophonist and composer
Rose-Marie Huuva (born 1943), Swedish Sami visual and textile artist, poet

I
Mariela Idivuoma (born 1976), Swedish Sami journalist and festival host
Ella Marie Hætta Isaksen (born 1998), Norwegian Sami singer
Signe Iversen (born 1956), language consultant and children's writer

J
Anna Jacobsen (1924–2004), Norwegian Sami writer, translator and publisher
Sofija Efimovna Jakimovič (1940–2006), Kildin Sámi folklorist and author
Ellinor Jåma (born 1979), Sami politician representing Åarjel-Saemiej Gielh
Sofia Jannok (born 1982), Swedish Sami singer and radio host
Jonne Järvelä (born 1974), Finnish vocalist and guitarist 
Agnete Johnsen (born 1994), Norwegian Sami pop singer
Siri Broch Johansen (born 1967), Norwegian Sami singer and educator
Annelise Josefsen (born 1949), Norwegian Sami artist
Inga Juuso (1945–2014), Norwegian Sami singer and actress

K
Ragnhild Vassvik Kalstad (born 1966), Norwegian Sami politician
Amanda Kernell (born 1986), Swedish Sami director and screenwriter
Aili Keskitalo (born 1968), Norwegian Sami politician
Asa Kitok (1894–1986), Swedish Sami birch-root artisan

L
Ann-Helén Laestadius (born 1971), journalist and children's novelist
Hildá Länsman (born 1993), Finnish Sami singer
Vibeke Larsen (born 1971), Norwegian Sami politician
Kristina Katarina Larsdotter (1819–1854), also Stor-Stina, exceptionally tall Swedish Sami
Rauni Magga Lukkari (born 1943), Northern Sami poet and translator

M
Rika Maja (1661–1757), Swedish Sami sharman
Margareta (c.1369–c.1425), Swedish Sami missionary
Maria Magdalena Mathsdotter (1835–1873), Swedish Sami founder of Sami schools
Randi Marainen (born 1953), Norwegian-born Swedish Sami silversmith
Britta Marakatt-Labba (born 1951), Swedish Sami textile artist
Maxida Märak (born 1988), Swedish-Sami yoik singer, actress and activist
Lajla Mattsson Magga (born 1942), Swedish-born Norwegian Sami teacher, children's writer and lexicographer
Maria Magdalena Mathsdotter (1835–1873), Swedish Sami school founder
Lajla Mattsson Magga (born 1942), Finnish-born Southern Sami teacher and children's writer
Silje Karine Muotka (born 1975), Norwegian Sami politician
Marit Myrvoll (born 1953), social anthropologist, museum director

N
Marja Bål Nango (born 1988), Norwegian Sami filmmaker
Harriet Nordlund (born 1954), Swedish Sami actress and dramatist
Anne Nuorgam (born 1964), Finnish Sami politician

O
Anna-Lisa Öst (1889–1974), known as Lapp-Lisa, Swedish Sami gospel singer
Sara Margrethe Oskal (born 1970), Norwegian Sami writer, actress and film producer
Marja-Liisa Olthuis (born 1967), Finnish Sami writer
Ida Ovmar (born 1995), Swedish Sami model

P
Kirsti Paltto (born 1947), Finnish Sami writer
Anja Pärson (born 1981), retired Swedish Sami alpine skier
Helga Pedersen (born 1973), Norwegian Sami politician
Synnøve Persen (born 1950), Norwegian Sami poet and visual artist
Ulla Pirttijärvi-Länsman (born 1971), Finnish Sami folk singer
Jelena Porsanger (born 1967), Russian-born Norwegian Sami ethnographer and cultural researcher

R
Elsa Laula Renberg (1877–1931), Swedish Sami activist, politician and writer

S
Tiina Sanila-Aikio (born 1983), musician, president of the Finnish Sami Parliament
Máret Ánne Sara (born 1983), Norwegian Sami artist and writer
Sollaug Sárgon (born 1965), Norwegian Sami poet
Kirsti Saxi (born 1953), Norwegian Sami politician
Katarina Pirak Sikku (born 1965), Swedish Sami painter and photographer
Åsa Simma (born 1963), Swedish Sami actress and theatre director
Ellen Aslaksdatter Skum (1827–1895), Borwegian Sami reindeer herder involved in the Kautokeino uprising
Inger Smuk (born 1947), Norwegian Sami politician
Liv Inger Somby (born 1962), educator, writer
Marry A. Somby (born 1953), children's writer
Karin Stenberg (1884–1969), Swedish Sami teacher and activist

T
Ann-Mari Thomassen (born 1964), Norwegian Sami politician
Lisa Thomasson (1898–1932), also Lapp-Lisa, Swedish singer of Sami descent
Sarah Thomasson (1925–1996), Swedish Sami alpine skier

U
Inger Elin Utsi (born 1975), Norwegian Sami politician
Ingunn Utsi (born 1948), Norwegian sculptor, painter and illustrator

V
Ellen Marie Vars (born 1957), Norwegian Sami writer
Láilá Susanne Vars (born 1976), Norwegian Sami lawyer and politician
Kristine Andersen Vesterfjell (1910–1987), Norwegian Southern Sami reindeer herder and culture advocate

W
Sandra Márjá West (born 1990), Norwegian Sami politician and festival manager
Sara Wesslin (born early 1990s), Finnish Sami journalist, supporter of the Skolt Sami language

See also
List of Sami people

Sami
Sami
Sami
Sami
women
Sámi-related lists